Tallinn City Museum is a city museum in Tallinn, Estonia.

Museum was founded in 1937 as Historic Museum of the City of Tallinn.

Since 2015 the museum co-operates with Google Inc. In October 2016 co-operation resulted from virtual Tallinn City Museum on Google Arts & Culture platform.

Gallery

Affiliate museums
The museum has several branches:
Kiek in de Kök Fortifications Museum
Children's museum Miiamilla
The City Museum
Kalamaja Museum
House of Peter the Great
Museum of Photography
Tallinn Russian Museum
Anton Hansen Tammsaare Museum (former) 
Eduard Vilde Museum (former)

References

External links

Virtual tour of the Tallinn City Museum provided by Google Arts & Culture

Museums in Tallinn
City museums